25 Aniversario is an album by Juan Gabriel.

25 Aniversario may also refer to:

25 Aniversario, album by La Misma Gente (Colombian band)
25 Aniversario, album by El Gran Combo de Puerto Rico
25 Aniversario, album by Simón Echeverría
25 Aniversario, album by Mariachi Sol de Mexico